The 2010 South Sydney Rabbitohs season was the 101st in the club's history. It competed in the National Rugby League's 2010 Telstra Premiership and finished 9th out of 16 teams, only just missing out on a place in the finals. The coach of the club was John Lang and club captain was Roy Asotasi.

Pre-season
The South Sydney Rabbitohs pre-season schedule began with a return to spiritual home Redfern Oval on Sunday 7 February, with the Rabbitohs winning 42–12 over the Manly-Warringah Sea Eagles. English Recruit Sam Burgess picked up his first try in Rabbitohs colours; Adam Reynolds, Jason Clark, Brock Molan, Kennedy Pettybourne, Josh Mansour, Curtis Johnston and Matt Mundine each scored a try.

Two weeks later the Rabbitohs took their pre-season to Coffs Harbour, New South Wales to play the Gold Coast Titans at BCU International Stadium in front of 5,500 supporters. The Titans took the match 28–22. Luke Capewell grabbed a double, while Issac Luke and Junior Vaivai scored the other two tries.

The Rabbitohs then took part in the traditional Charity Shield clash against the St George Illawarra Dragons. The Rabbitohs retained the Charity Shield after a 26–26 draw. Fetuli Fetuli Talanoa grabbed a treble; and Ben Lowe and Nathan Merritt scored the other two tries.

Results

Regular season

Results

Ladder

Kit and Sponsors

National Australia Bank
The National Australia Bank was the Rabbitohs major home sponsor for the 2010 Telstra Premiership.

DeLonghi
DeLonghi was the major away sponsor for the Rabbitohs in the 2010 Telstra Premiership.

V8 Supercars Australia
V8 Supercars was the Rabbitohs major sleeve sponsor for the 2010 Telstra Premiership.

Virgin Blue
Virgin Blue was the Rabbitohs major training sponsor for the 2010 Telstra Premiership.

Current squad
The following list comprises players who were in the Rabbitohs full-time first-grade squad for the 2010 season in the NRL Telstra Premiership.

''

Player statistics

Representative honours

References

South Sydney Rabbitohs seasons
South Sydney Rabbitohs season